Entacapone, sold under the brand name Comtan among others, is a medication commonly used in combination with other medications for the treatment of Parkinson's disease. Entacapone together with levodopa and carbidopa allows levodopa to have a longer effect in the brain and reduces Parkinson's disease signs and symptoms for a greater length of time than levodopa and carbidopa therapy alone.

Entacapone is a selective and reversible inhibitor of the enzyme catechol-O-methyltransferase (COMT). When taken together with levodopa (L-DOPA) and carbidopa, entacapone stops catechol-O-methyltransferase from breaking down and metabolizing levodopa, resulting in an overall increase of levodopa remaining in the brain and body.

Carbidopa/levodopa/entacapone (Stalevo), a medication developed by Orion Pharma and marketed by Novartis, is a single tablet formulation that contains levodopa, carbidopa, and entacapone.

Medical uses 
Entacapone is used in addition to levodopa and carbidopa for people with Parkinson's disease to treat the signs and symptoms of end-of-dose "wearing-off." "Wearing-off" is characterized by the re-appearance of both motor and non-motor symptoms of Parkinson's disease occurring towards the end of a previous levodopa and carbidopa dose. In clinical trials, entacapone has not been shown to slow progression or reverse Parkinson's disease.

Entacapone is an orally active drug that can be taken with or without food.

Pregnancy and breastfeeding 
Pregnancy category C: risk is not ruled out.

Although there have been animal studies that showed that entacapone was excreted into maternal rat milk, there have been no studies with human breast milk. Caution is advised for mothers taking entacapone while breastfeeding or during pregnancy.

Children 
Entacapone safety and efficacy have not been assessed in infants or children.

Liver problems 
Biliary excretion is the major route of excretion for entacapone. People with liver dysfunction may require additional caution and more frequent liver function monitoring while taking entacapone.

Kidney problems
There are no significant considerations for people with poor kidney function taking entacapone.

Contraindications 
There is a high risk for allergic reactions for people who are hypersensitive to entacapone.

Potential limiting conditions to consider before starting entacapone include:
 History of allergic reaction to entacapone 
 History of liver disease, liver dysfunction, or alcoholism
 Current or planned pregnancy
 Current or planned surgeries

Side effects 
The following side effects have been reported by people with Parkinson's disease treated with entacapone:
 Abdominal pain
 Nausea
 Vomiting
 Fatigue
 Dry mouth
 Back ache

Movement problems 
The most common side effect of entacapone is movement problems, which occur in 25% of people taking entacapone. This drug may cause or worsen dyskinesia for people with Parkinson's disease treated together with levodopa and carbidopa. In particular, "peak-dose dyskinesias" may occur when levodopa levels are at its peak concentration in the serum plasma.

Diarrhea 
10% of patients taking entacapone have been shown to experience diarrhea. Diarrhea may occur within 4–12 weeks of initial entacapone use but resolves after discontinuation of the drug. Use of entacapone in the presence of diarrhea can also be associated with weight loss, low potassium levels, and dehydration. In clinical studies, severe diarrhea was the most common reason for discontinuation of entacapone.

Urine color 
10% of people taking entacapone experience a change in urine color to orange, red, brown, or black. This side effect is due to entacapone metabolism and excretion in the urine and shown to not be harmful.

Sudden sleep onset 
People have reported sudden sleep onset while engaging in daily activities without prior warning of drowsiness. In controlled studies, patients on entacapone had a 2% increased risk of somnolence compared to placebo.

Low blood pressure 
Episodes of orthostatic hypotension have been shown to be more common at the start of entacapone use due to increased levels of levodopa.

Behavior problems
Post-marketing data shows that entacapone may change or worsen mental status, leading to behaviors such as delusions, agitation, confusion, and delirium.

People taking entacapone may experience increased urges to participate in gambling, sexual activities, money spending, and other stimulating reward behaviors.

Interactions 
In studies, entacapone has shown a low potential for interaction with other drugs. In theory, it could interact with MAO inhibitors, tricyclic antidepressants and noradrenaline reuptake inhibitors because they also increase catecholamine levels in the body, with drugs being metabolized by COMT (for example  methyldopa, dobutamine, apomorphine, adrenaline, and isoprenaline), with iron because it could form chelates, with substances binding to the same albumin site in the blood plasma (for example diazepam and ibuprofen), and with drugs being metabolized by the liver enzyme CYP2C9 (for example warfarin). None of the medications tested in studies have shown clinically relevant interactions, except perhaps warfarin for which a 13% (CI90: 6–19%) increase in INR was seen when combined with entacapone.

Pharmacology

Mechanism of action
Entacapone is a selective and reversible inhibitor of catechol-O-methyltransferase (COMT). COMT eliminates biologically active catechols present in catecholamines (dopamine, norepinephrine, and epinephrine) and their hydroxylated metabolites. When administered with a decarboxylase inhibitor, COMT acts as the major metabolizing enzyme for levodopa and metabolizes it to 3-methoxy-4-hydroxy-L-phenylalanine (3-OMD) in the brain and in the periphery.

For the treatment of Parkinson's disease, entacapone is given as an adjunct to levodopa and an aromatic amino acid decarboxylase inhibitor, carbidopa. Entacapone inhibits COMT in the periphery (but not, or at most marginally, in the brain) and the metabolism of levodopa, thus increasing plasma levels of levodopa and causing more constant dopaminergic stimulation in order to reduce the signs and symptoms presented in the disease.

Pharmacokinetics

Absorption 
The time to highest blood plasma concentrations is approximately one hour. The substance undergoes extensive first-pass metabolism. Absolute oral bioavailability (F) is 35%.

Distribution 
The volume of distribution  (Vd) after intravenous injection is approximately 20 liters. 98% of the circulating entacapone is bound to serum albumin, which limits its distribution into tissues.

Metabolism and elimination 
Entacapone is primarily metabolized to its glucuronide in the liver, and 5% are converted into the Z-isomer. It has a half-life of approximately 0.3–0.7 hours, with only 0.2% being excreted unchanged in the urine.

References

External links 
 

Carboxamides
Catechols
Catechol-O-methyltransferase inhibitors
Novartis brands
Nitriles
Nitrobenzenes